Abitibi Canyon was a community on the Abitibi River in northeastern Ontario, Canada. Abitibi Canyon was part of Northern Unorganized Cochrane District, in Cochrane District.

History
The construction of the Abitibi Canyon Generating Station at Abitibi Canyon began in 1930 for the Ontario Power Service Corporation, a subsidiary of the Abitibi Power and Paper Company, today's Resolute Forest Products. Work was suspended several years later, the company went into receivership and the project was taken over by the provincial Ontario Hydro in 1933.

The Abitibi Canyon settlement was established in 1930 to support the construction of the dam. In early years, construction and later support staff came by Ontario Northland Railway train to Fraserdale, then further by private siding, or used floatplanes. In 1966, a road connection via Fraserdale to Smooth Rock Falls, Ontario was built, designated today as Highway 634.

In 1940s, 130 people lived in the Ontario Hydro settlement, which rose to 300 by 1982. However, in 1980, Ontario Hydro decided to close the community as a cost-saving measure.

References

External links
Abitibi Canyon reunion website

Communities in Cochrane District